Luz Z. "Lucy" Arce Ferrer is a Puerto Rican politician. She is currently serving as a member of the Senate of Puerto Rico since 1996.

Early years and studies 

Lucy Arce was born in Aguadilla, Puerto Rico. She completed her bachelor's degree in English from the University of Puerto Rico at Mayagüez, graduating cum laude. She was then certified in Public Housing Administration by Temple University in Philadelphia, Pennsylvania.

Professional career 

Arce has worked as a teacher with the Head Start Program, and as an Ombudsman for the Aguadilla region. She also worked as Regional Director of the Public Housing Administration in Aguadilla, and then as Regional Manager of the Association of Commonwealth Employees (AEELA) in Arecibo.

In 1993, Arce was appointed as Auxiliar Administrator of the Retirement System Administration for the Government Employees of Puerto Rico. She also served as Commissioner of the Women Affairs Commission.

Political career 

Arce began her political career with the pro-statehood youth in Aguadilla. She presided the Women Organization of the New Progressive Party for eleven years, and also served as Vice-president of the party.

In 1996, Arce was elected as Senator At-large. She was the third candidate with most votes, and the second within her party. She was reelected in 2000 and 2004. Arce won a slot in the PNP ballot at the PNP primaries and in 2008, she was elected for her fourth consecutive term, being the fourth candidate with most votes, and the third within her party.

During her time in the Senate of Puerto Rico, she has served as Vice-president of the Senate, Alternate Majority Speaker, President of the Women Legislative Assembly, and President of Commissions of Work, Veteran Affairs, and Human Resources.

Personal life 

Lucy Arce has a daughter called Nayda, and five grandchildren.

See also

Senate of Puerto Rico

References

External links

 Hon. Luz Z. Arce Ferrer on SenadoPR

Living people
Members of the Senate of Puerto Rico
People from Aguadilla, Puerto Rico
Presidents pro tempore of the Senate of Puerto Rico
Temple University alumni
Year of birth missing (living people)